The New Zealand Women's Sevens is an annual women's rugby sevens tournament, currently hosted at Waikato Stadium in Hamilton. The tournament is one of the stops on the World Rugby Women's Sevens Series  and is hosted as part of a fully integrated women's and men's event.

History
The inaugural event in 2019, promoted as the Women's Fast Four, was an invitational competition held alongside the men's tournament on the world circuit, with home team New Zealand defeating France in the final.

Champions

References

 
World Rugby Women's Sevens Series tournaments
Recurring sporting events established in 2019
International women's rugby union competitions hosted by New Zealand
2019 establishments in New Zealand